Shorea kunstleri (called, along with some other species in the genus Shorea, red balau) is a species of plant in the family Dipterocarpaceae. It is found in Sumatra, Peninsular Malaysia and Borneo.

References

kunstleri
Trees of Sumatra
Trees of Peninsular Malaysia
Trees of Borneo
Critically endangered flora of Asia
Taxonomy articles created by Polbot